The 3rd Genie Awards were awarded on March 3, 1982, at the Royal Alexandra Theatre in Toronto, and honoured Canadian films released in 1981. It was hosted by Brian Linehan, with magician Doug Henning assisting by using card tricks and other illusions to reveal the winners.

The film The Plouffe Family (Les Plouffe) won the most awards overall, although Ticket to Heaven won Best Picture. Those two films were tied for most nominations overall, with 15 nods each.

Winners and nominees

References

External links
Genie Awards 1982 on IMDb

03
Genie
Genie